Hutak (also Romanized as Hūtak; also known as Huth, Hutk, and Lūtak) is a village in Moezziyeh Rural District, Chatrud District, Kerman County, Kerman Province, Iran. At the 2006 census, its population was 3,021, in 777 families.

References 

Populated places in Kerman County